In Mandaean cosmology, Mshunia Kushta  is a part of the World of Light considered to be the dwelling place of heavenly or ideal counterparts (dmuta). It is similar to Plato's concept of the hyperuranion (realm of Forms), which can be roughly described as a place in heaven where all ideas of real things are collected together.

Mshunia Kushta is considered to be the shkina (dwelling) of Anush Uthra.

See also
Hyperuranion in Platonism
Theory of forms in Platonism
Abstract and concrete
Adam kasia

References

Mandaean cosmology
Mandaean philosophical concepts
Mandaic words and phrases
Esoteric cosmology
Conceptions of heaven
Mythical utopias
Afterlife places
Truth
Counterparts